Diocese of Agra may refer to:
Roman Catholic Archdiocese of Agra
Diocese of Agra (Church of North India)